Hüseyin Cahit Yalçın (7 December 1874 – 18 October 1957) was a prominent Turkish theorist, writer and politician. He is famous for being a dissident journalist, who has been put on trial and punished due to his columns. His publications defending the idea of a homogenous nation became popular within the Party of Union and Progress.

Biography
Hüseyin Cahit was born in 1874 in Balıkesir. He was a graduate of Vefa High School, Istanbul. He started his literary life by writing stories, novels and prose poems. He later wrote on journalism, criticism and translation. He also wrote satirical poems under the pseudonym Hemrah. He is one of the most important figures of the Edebiyat-ı Cedide (New Literary Movement). After the Second Constitutional Era, he helped Tevfik Fikret and Hüseyin Kazım to publish the Tanin newspaper, as it was put into political life. By the time he started his political career and joined the Union and Progress Party. He was selected to Ottoman Parliament (Meclis-i Mebusan) in 1908 and served until 1912. Between 1908 and 1911, he wrote for Tanin, in which he opposed a German influence on the Ottoman Empire. 

He escaped to Romania during 31 March Incident since rebels had decided to kill him but they murdered Mehmet Aslan Bey instead. After the suppression of the riots, he returned to Istanbul.

In 1911, he started working at Ottoman Public Debt Administration. However, he had to leave Istanbul again in 1912 and moved to Wien as his journal Tanin was closed due to his opposing views. He came back to Istanbul only after 1913 Ottoman coup d'état.

After the First World War, Huseyin Cahit was exiled to Malta and stayed there until 1922. Right after his return he started a newspaper called Renin but after a while renamed it as Tanin. He supported Mustafa Kemal and Turkish Independence War in his articles. However, he contradicted Ankara Government soon due to abolition of sultanate and the caliphate.

During Ataturk era (1923-1938) Huseyin Cahit kept his position as an opposition journalist and criticized many policies of the Government, including the revolutions such as abolition of caliphate and language reform. Huseyin Cahit promoted liberal democracy and blamed Ankara Government for imposing a tight control over society and culture. However, his criticisms were perceived suspiciously due to his background with the Union and Progress Party. He was put on trial by Independence Court for 3 times, he was acquitted twice but in 1925 he was exiled to Çorum. In 1926 banishment was forgiven and he returned to Istanbul.

After Ataturk's death, Huseyin Cahit was invited to CHP by İsmet İnönü and he was elected to the Parliament.

He started publishing Tanin newspaper again in 1943. He wrote articles against communism. In his article dated 3 December 1945, he directly blamed Tan newspaper and Sabiha Sertel for supporting communism and the USSR. This article played an important role on provoking people and the headquarters of Tan was assaulted on 4 December.

In 1954, when he was jailed again for his article against Democrat Party. He was forgiven by the Head of Republic Celal Bayar since he was 79 years old at that time. In 1957, he was a candidate for Parliament elections but he died on 18 October 1957 before the results.

Support for the Armenian genocide
In 1936, Yalçın wrote an article arguing that Bahaeddin Şakir (who is generally considered to be the main architect of the Armenian genocide) should be honored for his role in the Armenian Genocide.

References

External links

20th-century Turkish journalists
1874 births
1957 deaths
People from Balıkesir
Republican People's Party (Turkey) politicians
Committee of Union and Progress politicians
Vefa High School alumni
Writers from the Ottoman Empire
Politicians from the Ottoman Empire